Spelobia baezi is a species of fly belonging to the family of the Lesser Dung flies.

Distribution
Andorra, Canary Islands, Cyprus, France, Great Britain, Ireland, Italy, Lebanon, Morocco, Spain, Tunisia.

References

Sphaeroceridae
Muscomorph flies of Europe
Diptera of Asia
Diptera of Africa
Insects described in 1977